USNS Hope is a U.S. Navy ship name. It may refer to:

 , lead ship of the 
 , a 
 , a

See also
 , a U.S. Navy ship name
 Bob Hope-class vehicle cargo ship